Uehara (written:  lit. "upper plain" or  lit. "planted plain") is a Japanese surname. In Okinawan language, it's pronounced as 'Wiibaru. Notable people with the surname include:

, Japanese golfer
, Japanese classical pianist
, Japanese singer
, Japanese singer and soldier
Edwin Uehara (born 1969), Peruvian-Japanese footballer
, politician and cabinet minister 
, Japanese musician
, Japanese jazz composer and pianist
, Japanese actor
, Japanese manga artist
, Japanese fencer
Koichi Uehara (born 1947), Japanese golfer
, Japanese baseball player
, Japanese kickboxer
, Japanese speed skater
, Japanese actress
, Japanese gravure idol and television personality
, Japanese long-distance runner
, Japanese singer-songwriter
, Imperial Japanese Army flight captain
, Japanese automotive engineer
, Japanese footballer
, Japanese singer and actress
, Japanese general
, Japanese boxer

Fictional characters 

 , a character from the manga series Great Teacher Onizuka

See also
Siege of Uehara, a battle of the Sengoku period

Japanese-language surnames
Okinawan surnames